is a Kofun period burial mound located in what is now the city of Maebashi, Gunma Prefecture in the northern Kantō region of Japan. It was designated a National Historic Site of Japan in 1927.

Overview
The tumulus is located on a plain near the southeastern slopes of Mount Haruna, and is one of a cluster of kofun tumuli in the area. It has a total length of 89.9 meters and was built in two tiers, orientated to the west. The surface was originally covered in fukiishi with rows of cylindrical haniwa. From the topography of the site, it is believed that the tumulus was surrounded by a moat, although this has not yet been confirmed via archaeological excavation. Although the detailed structure of the mound has not been investigated yet, it is known to have two lateral burial chambers, one in the posterior circular portion and one in the anterior rectangular portion, but with differing construction methods. The burial chamber in the circular portion is 9.4 meters long by 3.4 meters wide and has walls made of large dressed blocked of andesite, although the ceiling has collapsed. This is one of then largest burial chambers found in Gunma Prefecture. The one in the rectangular portion is lined with natural stones and is 8.76 meters long by 2.22 meters wide. From the stonework, it is estimated that this tumulus was built in the late 6th century AD, or towards the end of the Kofun period. 

The tomb was opened in then mid-Edo period, and many grave goods including bronze and iron swords, magatama beads, gold earrings, long-necked iron jars, and Sue ware earthenware pottery were recovered. A few of these artifacts are preserved at the Tokyo National Museum, but most have been lost over the years. These include at least one sword with a silver hilt, which is mentioned in the Edo period records, but whose whereabouts are unknown.

In 1874, in response to a Meiji government project to find the grave of the legendary Toyoki-irihiko no Mikoto, the founder of Keno Province mentioned in the Nara period Nihon Shoki chronicle, Gunma Prefecture officially submitted the Sōja Futagoyama Kofun as a possible candidate. This petition was denied by the Imperial Household Agency due to lack of evidence, and due to publicity received by findings at the Maefutago Kofun which was believed at the time to have a better claim.

Overall length 89.9 meters
Posterior circular portion 44 meter diameter x 7.5 meters high, 2-tier
Anterior rectangular portion 61 meters wide x 8 meters high, 2-tier

See also
List of Historic Sites of Japan (Gunma)

References

External links
Maebashi City official guide 

Kofun
History of Gunma Prefecture
Maebashi
Archaeological sites in Japan
Historic Sites of Japan